Churachand Singh Trophy, also known as the Churachand Singh Invitation Trophy (Sir Churachand Singh  Memorial Football Tournament), is an annual Indian football tournament held in Manipur and organized by All Manipur Football Association (A.M.F.A).

History
The tournament was first started in 1950 and is named after Manipur's Maharaja Churachand Singh. At its every inception, the Tournament had been organised by the Manipur Sports Association (MSA). With the amalgamation of Manipur Sports Association and Manipur Olympic Association in 1954, the Tournament came under the management of All Manipur Football Association. Apart from some top clubs from Manipur, clubs from neighbouring states also have participated.

Assam Rifles have won the tournament for a record nine times. The current champions are NEROCA FC who won their 6th title by defeating Southern Sporting Union at the 62nd edition of the tournament in 2020.

Trophy
The Winner's Trophy was donated by the former King Bodhchandra Singh in memory of his father and is a gold plated Shield.

Venues
The matches of the tournament are held in multiple venues in Manipur and final is played at Khuman Lampak Main Stadium.

Results

References 

Football in Manipur
Football cup competitions in India
1950 establishments in India
Recurring sporting events established in 1950